

Events 
March 28 – Mozart returns to Salzburg from a tour of Italy but is back in Milan for the premiere of his opera Ascanio in Alba on October 17.
Foundation of the Royal Theatre Ballet School in Copenhagen, Denmark.
The Chevalier de Saint-Georges is appointed maestro of the Concert des Amateurs in Paris.
Probable – Carl Ditters von Dittersdorf becomes Hoffkomponist (court composer) to Philipp Gotthard von Schaffgotsch, Prince-Bishop of Breslau, at château Jánský Vrch (Johannesberg) in Javorník.

Classical music 
Carl Friedrich Abel 
6 Trio Sonatas, WK 86-91 Op. 9
6 Easy Sonatas, WK 141-146
Carl Phillip Emanuel Bach 
6 Harpsichord Concertos, Wq.43
Ich will dem Herrn lobsingen
Luigi Boccherini
Cello Sonata in A major, G.4
6 String Quintets, G.265-270, Op. 10
6 String Quintets Op. 11 (with the famous minuet, No. 5 (G 275))
Symphony in D major, Op. 12 no 1/G 503
Symphony in E-flat major, Op. 12 no 2/G 504
Symphony in C major, Op. 12 no 3/G 505
 František Xaver Brixi – Pastorella in C major for organ
Muzio Clementi – 6 Piano Sonatas, Op. 1
 Ernst Eichner 
 3 Harpsichord Trios, Op. 3
 Harp Concerto in D major, Op. 9
 Baldassare Galuppi 
 Confitebor tibi Domine in G major
 Jephte et Helcana (oratorio)
 Tommaso Giordani – 6 Harpsichord Quintets, Op. 1
Joseph Haydn 
Baryton Trio in A major, Hob.XI:7
Baryton Trio in A major, Hob.XI:9
Baryton Trio in B minor, Hob.XI:96
Piano Sonata in C minor Hob. XVI:20
Keyboard Concerto in C major, Hob.XVIII:10
Symphony No. 42
Symphony No. 43
 James Hook – 6 Keyboard Concertos, Op. 1
Thomas Linley Jr – Violin Concerto in F major
Leopold Mozart – Missa brevis in C major (formerly attributed to W.A. Mozart as K. 115)
Wolfgang Amadeus Mozart
Aria for soprano and orchestra, “Non curo l’affetto”, K. 74b
Symphony No. 12
Symphony No. 13
Symphony No. 14
Symphony in F, “No. 42”, K. 75/75
Symphony No. 46 in C major, K.96/111b
Symphony No. 50 in D major, K.161/141a
Divertimento No. 1 in E-flat major, K. 113
Regina coeli for soprano, chorus and orchestra in C major, K. 108/74d
Litaniae Lauretanae in B-flat major, K. 109/74e
Betulia liberata, oratorio K. 118/74c
Johann Gottfried Müthel – Keyboard Duet in E-flat major
Josef Mysliveček – Veni sponsa Christi
Johann Gottfried Wilhelm Palschau – Harpsichord Concertos No.1-2
Niccolo Piccinni – Le finte gemelle, intermezzo premiered Jan. 2 in Rome
Johann Baptist Vanhal 
6 String Quartets, Op. 6
6 Oboe Quartets, Op. 7

Opera 
Pasquale Anfossi 
Lucio Papirio
Quinto Fabio
I visionari
Thomas Arne – The Fairy Prince
André Grétry 
L'ami de la maison
Zémire et Azor
Johann Adolph Hasse – Ruggiero
Wolfgang Amadeus Mozart – Ascanio in Alba
Josef Mysliveček – Il Gran Tamerlano
Giovanni Paisiello 
Annibale in Torino
Artaserse, R.1.30
Demetrio, R.1.25
I scherzi di amore e di fortuna, R.1.28
Antonio Salieri – Armida

Methods and theory writings 

 Anselm Bayly – A Practical Treatise on Singing and Playing
 Anton Bemetzrieder – Leçons de clavecin, et principes d’harmonie
 Charles Burney – The Present State of Music in France and Italy
Johann Kirnberger – Die Kunst des reinen Satzes in der Musik

Births 
February 9 – Daniel Belknap, composer (d. 1815)
February 24 – Johann Baptist Cramer, pianist (d. 1858)
March 19 – , poet and librettist (died 1852)
March 21 – Thomas John Dibdin, dramatist and songwriter (d. 1841)
May 13 – Siegfried August Mahlmann, librettist and poet (died 1826)
June 1 – Ferdinando Paër, Italian composer (died 1839)
August 15 – Walter Scott, librettist and novelist (died 1832)
August 27 – Friedrich Methfessel, composer (died 1807)
September 17 – Johann August Apel, librettist (d. 1816)
October 1 – Pierre Baillot, violinist and composer (d. 1842)
October 3 – Auguste Creuzé de Lesser, librettist and politician (died 1839)
October 9 – Charles-Augustin Bassompierre (Sewrin), librettist (died 1853)
October 29 – Anna Leonore König, member of the Royal Swedish Academy of Music (d. 1854)
November 1 – , librettist (died 1839)
November 4 – James Montgomery, librettist and editor (died 1854)
November 17 – Jonathan Huntington, composer (d. 1838)
December 26 – Heinrich Joseph von Collin, librettist and poet (died 1811)
date unknown: 
 Marie Antoinette Petersén, singer and member of the Royal Swedish Academy of Music (d. 1855)
 Margareta Sofia Lagerqvist, opera singer (d. 1800)

Deaths 
January 23 – Martin Berteau, composer and musician (born 1691)
March 11 – Christoph Birkmann, hymnist and pupil of JS Bach (born 1703)
March 30 – Anton Joseph Hampel, horn player (b. 1710)
May 20 – Christopher Smart, poet and hymn-writer (b. 1722; possible liver failure)
May 29 – Johann Adolph Hass, clavichord and harpsichord maker (b. 1713)
July 30 – Thomas Gray, librettist and poet (born 1716)
August 19 – Daniel Schiebeler, librettist and hymnist (born 1741)
October – René de Galard de Béarn, Marquis de Brassac, composer (born 1699)
October 14 – František Brixi, composer (b. 1732)
October 28 – Johann Gottlieb Graun, composer (b. 1703)
November 4 – Pierre Nicolas Brunet, librettist and playwright (born 1733)
November 18 – Giuseppe de Majo, Italian composer (born 1697)
date unknown – Andrea Soldi, copyist and portraitist (born 1703)

References

 
18th century in music
Music by year